Martin Bucksbaum (July 31, 1920 – July 7, 1995) was an American business executive. He served as the chairman and chief executive officer of GGP Inc., a publicly traded real estate investment trust that invests in shopping centers.

Early life
Bucksbaum was born July 31, 1920. His father, Louis Bucksbaum, owned three grocery stores in Marshalltown, Iowa. He had two brothers, Matthew and Maurice. Bucksbaum served in the United States Army during World War II.

Career
With his brothers Matthew and Maurice, Bucksbaum took a $1.2 million loan to develop Town & Country in Cedar Rapids, Iowa in 1953. At the time, it was one of the first malls in the United States. In 1954, the three brothers co-founded General Growth Properties, now known as GGP Inc. Bucksbaum served as its chairman and chief executive officer. By 1995, the company owned 21 malls in the US. In Iowa, the malls that Bucksbaum helped develop were located in small towns like Waterloo, Bettendorf, Council Bluffs, Davenport, Sioux City, Cedar Falls, Keokuk, West Burlington, Muscatine as well as cities like Ames and Des Moines.

Bucksbaum served on the board of directors of the Offitbank. He was a member of the International Council of Shopping Centers and a governor of the National Association of Real Estate Investment Trusts.

Personal life, death and legacy
Bucksbaum married Melva Venezky. They had two sons, Gene and Glenn, and a daughter, Mary. They resided in Des Moines, Iowa. Bucksbaum served on the board of governors of Drake University as well as the national committee of the Whitney Museum of American Art. He was a member of the Marshalltown Masonic Lodge.

Bucksbaum died of a heart attack on July 7, 1995, in Des Moines, Iowa, at 74. His funeral was held at Temple B'Nai Jeshurun, and he was buried in the Jewish Glendale Cemetery.

Shortly after his death, Bucksbaum was succeeded as chairman and CEO of GPP by his brother Matthew Bucksbaum.

References

1920 births
1995 deaths
People from Marshalltown, Iowa
United States Army personnel of World War II
Businesspeople from Des Moines, Iowa
American company founders
American chief executives
American chairpersons of corporations
American corporate directors
Brookfield Properties people
Drake University people
American Freemasons
20th-century American Jews
Bucksbaum family